CRuMs is a proposed clade of microbial eukaryotes, whose name is an acronym of the following constituent groups: i) collodictyonids also known as diphylleids, ii) rigifilids and iii) mantamonadids as sister of the Amorphea. It more or less supersedes Varisulca, as Ancyromonadida are inferred not to be specifically related to the orders Collodictyonida, Rigifilida and Mantamonadida.

Phylogeny

References

Eukaryote subphyla
Podiata